Annesley is a village and civil parish in the Ashfield district of Nottinghamshire, England, between Hucknall and Kirkby-in-Ashfield.  At the 2011 census, it had a population of 1,162 (including Annesley Woodhouse to the west). 

Annesley Hall is a grade two listed building, once owned by the Chaworth-Musters family, which has connections to the Byron family of nearby Newstead Abbey. Annesley Old Church was mentioned by Lord Byron and D. H. Lawrence. There is also close by the earthworks of Annesley Castle.

The Misk Hills lie to the south of the village. Annesley is part of Nottinghamshire's Hidden Valleys area. The parish is grouped with the neighbouring parish of Felley to elect a joint parish council. The old church of Annesley was dedicated to All Saints. It was allowed to become derelict in the 1940s. Features of interest included the east window of the south aisle, the 13th century sedilia and the 17th century royal arms in stucco. 

The village is on the A611 for Mansfield near junction 27 of the M1. Nearby to the south is the roundabout with the A608, which is now a thoroughfare to Sherwood Park Enterprise Zone.

It was connected to Nottingham by rail until Annesley railway station closed in 1953.

See also
All Saints' Church, Annesley (1874)
Annesley Old Church (1356)
Annesley Hall

References

External links

 Annesley and Felley Parish Council
 Nottinghamshire history
 Photographs of The Former Annesley Colliery Buildings
 Annesley at Old Notts (archived)
 All Saints church – research project
 Annesley Woodhouse Quarry Nature Reserve
 Former colliery at Annesley Woodhouse
 Railway memories of Annesley yard and loco depot
 

Ashfield District
Villages in Nottinghamshire